Abraham II (died 1787) was Greek Orthodox Patriarch of Jerusalem (June/July 1775 – November 13, 1787).

1787 deaths
18th-century Greek Orthodox Patriarchs of Jerusalem
Year of birth unknown